Zirconia toughened alumina is a ceramic material comprising alumina and zirconia. It is a composite ceramic material with zirconia grains in the alumina matrix.

It is also known in industry as ZTA.

Zirconia aluminia (or zirconia toughened alumina), a combination of zirconium oxide and aluminum oxide, is part of a class of composite ceramics called AZ composites. Noted for their mechanical properties, AZ composites are commonly used in structural applications, as cutting tools, and in many medical applications. Additionally, AZ composites feature high strength, fracture toughness, elasticity, hardness, and wear resistance. Zirconia toughened alumina (ZTA), in particular, offers several key properties.

Structure
The mechanical robustness compared to alumina is attributed to the displacive phase transformation of the metastable tetragonal zirconia grains when the material is stressed. The stress concentration at a crack tip can cause a transformation from a tetragonal crystal structure to a monoclinic one, which has an associated volume expansion of zirconia. This volume expansion effectively pushes back the propagation of the crack and results in higher toughness and strength.  A common specimen of Zirconia Toughened Alumina will have 10-20% zirconium oxides.  The 20-30% increase in strength often meets the design criteria needed at a much lower cost.  Depending on the percentage that is Zirconium, the properties of this ceramic can be manipulated for the applications required.  Zirconia Toughened Alumina is generally referred as the intermediary between Alumina and Zirconium and as priced as such.  This gives the ZTA a much lower price range than other similar materials.  The increase in composite strength is done by a process called Stress Induced Transformation Toughening.    This process causes internal strains, which causes crack in the structure of the Zirconium.  Because of the crack, the Zirconium particles allowed to switch phases and move more freely amongst the Alumina particles.   This causes an increase in Zirconia particles with the same amount of Alumina particles, creating the increase is strength.

Chemical and mechanical properties

Uses 
Recently, there have been many uses for Zirconia Toughened Alumina, including valve seals, bushing, pump components, joint implants, wire bonding capillaries, cutting tool inserts, and many more.  ZTA has a diverse range of properties, giving its importance in an array of applications. In the medical industry, ZTA serves as a ceramic that can be used in joint replacement and rehabilitation.  ZTA's high wear resistance helps create high performance implants.  Because of ZTA's high strength and corrosion resistance, it enables the material to withstand heavy loads without succumbing to degradation; giving ZTA many uses in load bearing applications.  ZTA's toughness also means that it has many uses in cutting tools.  ZTA and other Alumina are often used in metal cutting applications.  Certain engine components, labware, industrial crucibles, refractory tubes can be manufactured using ZTA.  Also, certain abrasive applications, such as sandblasting, can also be manufactured using ZTA.

See also
 Zirconia alumina

References

External links
 Material Properties Data: Zirconia-Toughened Alumina (ZTA)

Ceramic materials